Phareodus is a genus of freshwater fish from the Paleocene to the Eocene of Australia, Europe and North and South America.

This genus includes at least four species, P. testis (Leidy, 1873) and P. encaustus of North America, P. muelleri of Europe, and P. queenslandicus of Australia. Representatives have been found in the middle Eocene of Australia, Europe and North America, including the Green River Formation in Wyoming, United States. Fossils of the genus have also been found in the Paleocene (Tiupampan) Santa Lucía Formation of Bolivia.

P. testis was a freshwater fish with an oval outline, a small head, and a slightly pointed snout. Its dorsal and anal fins were situated posteriorly, with the anal fin being larger. Its caudal fin was slightly forked. It had small pelvic fins but long, narrow pectoral fins.

See also

 Prehistoric fish
 List of prehistoric bony fish

References

Prehistoric ray-finned fish genera
Osteoglossidae
Eocene fish
Paleocene fish
Freshwater fish
Prehistoric fish of Australia
Prehistoric fish of North America
Prehistoric fish of South America
Paleocene animals of South America
Tiupampan
Paleogene Bolivia
Fossils of Bolivia
Fossil taxa described in 1873